Qatar Media Corporation (formerly known as Qatar General Broadcasting and Television Corporation) is a public service broadcasting network in Qatar. It was incorporated on 27 April 1997. Several television channels and radio networks are being run by this organization, including Qatar TV and the Qatar Broadcasting Service (QBS) radio station, Qatar Radio. QMC is a member of the Asia-Pacific Broadcasting Union.

See also
 Mass media in Qatar

References

External links
Official website

Television networks in Qatar
1997 establishments in Qatar
State media
Mass media companies established in 1997
Mass media companies of Qatar
Mass media in Qatar
Radio in Qatar
Government-owned companies of Qatar
Multilingual broadcasters